The 2019–20 Murray State Racers men's basketball team represented Murray State University during the 2019–20 NCAA Division I men's basketball season. The Racers, led by fifth-year head coach Matt McMahon, played their home games at the CFSB Center in Murray, Kentucky as members of the Ohio Valley Conference. They finished the season 23–9, 15–3 in OVC play to finish in a tie for the OVC regular season championship. They defeated Austin Peay in the semifinals of the OVC tournament to advance to the championship game where they lost to Belmont. With 23 wins, they were a candidate for a postseason bid. However, all postseason tournaments were cancelled amid the COVID-19 pandemic.

Previous season
The Racers finished the 2018–19 season 28–5, 16–2 in OVC play to tie as OVC regular season championship with Belmont. They defeated Jacksonville State and Belmont to become champions of the OVC tournament. They earned the OVC's automatic bid to the NCAA tournament where they won in the first round against Marquette. They then lost in the second round to Florida State.

Roster

Schedule and results

|-
!colspan=9 style=| Exhibition

|-
!colspan=9 style=| Regular season

|-
!colspan=9 style=| OVC Regular Season

|-
!colspan=12 style=| Ohio Valley Conference tournament
|-

|-

References

Murray State Racers men's basketball seasons
Murray State
Murray State
Murray State